Alexandro Alves Ferreira (born 3 July 1975), known as Alex Alves, is a Brazilian football manager and former player who played as a striker.

Club career
Born in Barbosa Ferraz, he spent many season at various clubs from São Paulo state. He signed a three-year contract with Cruzeiro in July 2003, but spent one loan to Botafogo and Denizlispor for two and a half season. He later signed a contract with Madureira.

References

External links
Profile at TFF
Profile at SambaFoot
 CBF

1975 births
Living people
Brazilian footballers
Clube Atlético Juventus players
Esporte Clube Bahia players
Associação Portuguesa de Desportos players
Cruzeiro Esporte Clube players
Botafogo de Futebol e Regatas players
Denizlispor footballers
Esporte Clube Juventude players
Mirassol Futebol Clube players
Madureira Esporte Clube players
Brasiliense Futebol Clube players
Brazilian expatriate footballers
Brazilian expatriate sportspeople in Turkey
Expatriate footballers in Turkey
Association football forwards
Sportspeople from Paraná (state)
Clube Atlético Juventus managers
Brazilian football managers
Associação Portuguesa de Desportos managers
Audax Rio de Janeiro Esporte Clube managers
Sertãozinho Futebol Clube managers
Grêmio Osasco Audax Esporte Clube managers